Strathdee is a Scottish surname. It means from the Strath of the River Dee in Aberdeenshire. Notable people with the surname include:

Roy Brown Strathdee (1897–1976), Scottish chemist
Joanna Strathdee (1954–2015), Scottish politician
Steffanie A. Strathdee (born 1966), Canadian-born American epidemiologist

See also
River Dee, Aberdeenshire